Demetrius Pinder (born 13 February 1989) is a Bahamian male track and field sprint athlete who competes in the 400 metres. His personal best for the event is 44.77 seconds. At the 2012 London Olympics he was a 400 m finalist and relay gold medallist.

He was born in Freeport, Grand Bahama where he attended Tabernacle Baptist Christian Academy. In March 2011 he broke the 400 m indoor Bahamian national record of 45.78 previously held by Chris Brown with his 45.33 win at the 2011 NCAA Division I Indoor Championships. He won a 400 m silver medal in the 2012 IAAF World Indoor Championships in Istanbul. He placed seventh in the 400 m final at 2012 London Olympic Games. He also won gold at the 2012 London Olympics with the Bahamas 4x400 team, of himself, Chris Brown, Michael Mathieu and Ramon Miller beating medal favorites USA with a national record.

In 2013 his Olympic Gold medal was stolen out of his vehicle in Bradenton, Florida, but it was later retrieved by local police.

Personal life

Personal bests

International competitions

References

External links
 TEXAS A&M PROFILE
 
 
 
 TNF Bahamas/MileSplit Athlete Profile
http://www.flashresults.com/2011_Meets/indoor/03-11-NCAADiv1/Results3-2.htm
http://www.athletic.net/TrackAndField/Athlete.aspx?AID=1770776
http://www.trackalerts.com/index.php?option=com_content&view=article&id=4126:pinder-riley-williams-strike-gold-at-ncaa-d1-nationals&catid=3806:lead-stories&Itemid=82
Pinder 4x 400m Relay Carifta 2006

1989 births
Living people
Bahamian male sprinters
People from Freeport, Bahamas
Texas A&M Aggies men's track and field athletes
Athletes (track and field) at the 2012 Summer Olympics
Athletes (track and field) at the 2016 Summer Olympics
Olympic athletes of the Bahamas
Olympic gold medalists for the Bahamas
Medalists at the 2012 Summer Olympics
Olympic gold medalists in athletics (track and field)
Central American and Caribbean Games silver medalists for the Bahamas
Competitors at the 2010 Central American and Caribbean Games
World Athletics Indoor Championships medalists
Central American and Caribbean Games medalists in athletics
Essex County College alumni
Junior college men's track and field athletes in the United States